Come With Me To Hell, Pt. 1 is the third studio album collaboration between Memphis-based rappers DJ Paul and Lord Infamous. It was released in 1994 and distributed through the independent record label, Prophet Entertainment. A "Remastered Edition" of Come With Me To Hell, Pt. 1 was released on March 6, 2014, to critical acclaim, following the success of the re-released material.

The album was produced by DJ Paul and fellow Three 6 Mafia founder Juicy J in its entirety. Many of the songs — such as "Long n Hard" and "Back Against Da Wall" — were later recycled for successive releases from Three 6 Mafia.

Track listing
"Intro" – 2:25
"1000 Blunts" – 2:58
"Long N Hard" – 5:10
"Drop It Off Yo Ass" – 5:12
"Take Care Of Yo Business" – 4:35
"Lick My Nutz – 3:19
"Smoke A Junt" – 4:27
"Ya Ain't Mad is Ya?" – 4:17
"All Dirty Hoes" – 5:02
"187 Invitation" – 4:33
"Its Cummin'" – 3:55
"Back Against Da Wall" – 3:25
"Shout Outs" – 2:04
"Too Deep To Breathe" – 2:46

References

Come with Me 2 Hell at Trump Tightest Underground Music

1994 albums
DJ Paul albums
Lord Infamous albums
Gangsta rap albums by American artists